In Greek mythology, Polybus (Ancient Greek: Πόλυβος) may refer to the following personages:

 Polybus, father by Argia of Argus, builder of the ship Argo. Others credited Danaus or Arestor to be this Argonaut's father.
 Polybus, king of Corinth who was best known for having reared Oedipus.
 Polybus, son of Hermes and king of Sicyon.
 Polybus, king of the Egyptian Thebes.
 Polybus, father of Eurymachus, one of the suitors of Penelope.
 Polybus, son of Antenor.
Polybus, a skilled Phaeacian craftsman who made a beautiful ball for Halius and Laodamas to play with.
 Polybus, one of the suitors of Penelope who came from Zacynthus along with other 43 wooers. He was killed by Eumaeus, swineheard and friend of Odysseus.
 Polybus, another suitor of Penelope from Zacynthus. He suffered the same fate as his above namesake.

Notes

References 

 Apollodorus, The Library with an English Translation by Sir James George Frazer, F.B.A., F.R.S. in 2 Volumes, Cambridge, MA, Harvard University Press; London, William Heinemann Ltd. 1921. ISBN 0-674-99135-4. Online version at the Perseus Digital Library. Greek text available from the same website.
Apollonius Rhodius, Argonautica translated by Robert Cooper Seaton (1853-1915), R. C. Loeb Classical Library Volume 001. London, William Heinemann Ltd, 1912. Online version at the Topos Text Project.
 Apollonius Rhodius, Argonautica. George W. Mooney. London. Longmans, Green. 1912. Greek text available at the Perseus Digital Library.
 Gaius Julius Hyginus, Fabulae from The Myths of Hyginus translated and edited by Mary Grant. University of Kansas Publications in Humanistic Studies. Online version at the Topos Text Project.
Homer, The Odyssey with an English Translation by A.T. Murray, PH.D. in two volumes. Cambridge, MA., Harvard University Press; London, William Heinemann, Ltd. 1919. . Online version at the Perseus Digital Library. Greek text available from the same website.
Pausanias, Description of Greece with an English Translation by W.H.S. Jones, Litt.D., and H.A. Ormerod, M.A., in 4 Volumes. Cambridge, MA, Harvard University Press; London, William Heinemann Ltd. 1918. . Online version at the Perseus Digital Library
Pausanias, Graeciae Descriptio. 3 vols. Leipzig, Teubner. 1903.  Greek text available at the Perseus Digital Library.
Quintus Smyrnaeus, The Fall of Troy translated by Way. A. S. Loeb Classical Library Volume 19. London: William Heinemann, 1913. Online version at theio.com
Quintus Smyrnaeus, The Fall of Troy. Arthur S. Way. London: William Heinemann; New York: G.P. Putnam's Sons. 1913. Greek text available at the Perseus Digital Library.

Suitors of Penelope
Mythology of Argos